Robert Edward Fleming (born 1936), is an American literary scholar known for his work on Ernest Hemingway. He is a professor emeritus of English at the University of New Mexico.  In 2005 he co-edited (with Robert W. Lewis) a scholarly edition of Ernest Hemingway's Under Kilimanjaro.

He was a co-editor of American Literary Realism 1870–1910 from 1986 to 1996.

See also
 Charles Fletcher Lummis
 James Weldon Johnson
 Arna Wendell Bontemps
 Sinclair Lewis
 Willard Motley

Publications

References

American literary critics
Living people
1936 births
University of New Mexico faculty